Song Myung-geun (Hangul: 송명근; born 12 March 1993) is a volleyball player from South Korea. He currently plays as an outside hitter for the Ansan OK Savings Bank. As a sophomore at Kyonggi University in 2012, Song made his first appearance for the South Korean national team and competed in the 2012 FIVB Volleyball World League, where the team finished in 14th place. He also competed in the World League in 2013 and 2014, and won the gold medal at the 2014 Asian Men's Cup Volleyball Championship.

References

External links
 Song Myung-geun profile at 2013 World League
 Song Myung-geun profile at 2014 World Championship
 profile at FIVB.org

1993 births
Living people
South Korean men's volleyball players
Asian Games medalists in volleyball
Volleyball players at the 2014 Asian Games
Volleyball players at the 2018 Asian Games
Place of birth missing (living people)
Asian Games silver medalists for South Korea
Asian Games bronze medalists for South Korea
Medalists at the 2014 Asian Games
Medalists at the 2018 Asian Games
People from Cheonan
Sportspeople from South Chungcheong Province
21st-century South Korean people